Edward Dillingham Bangs (August 24, 1790 – April 1, 1838) was an American politician who served as the 6th Massachusetts Secretary of the Commonwealth from 1824 to 1836.

Early life
Bangs was born on August 24, 1790 in Worcester, Massachusetts, to Hannah (Lynde) Bangs  and  Judge Edward Bangs.

Bangs was elected a member of the American Antiquarian Society in 1819.

Family life
On April 12, 1824, Bangs married Mary Grosvenor of Pomfret, Connecticut.

Notes

1790 births
1838 deaths
Politicians from Worcester, Massachusetts
Secretaries of the Commonwealth of Massachusetts
19th-century American people
Harvard University alumni
Members of the American Antiquarian Society
19th-century American politicians